The men's 100 metres at the 2011 Asian Athletics Championships was held at the Kobe Universiade Memorial Stadium on the 7 and 8 of July.

Medalists

Records

Schedule

Results

Round 1
First 3 in each heat (Q) and 4 best performers (q) advanced to the Semifinals.

Semi-finals
First 3 in each heat (Q) and 2 best performers (q) advanced to the final.

Final

References

100 metres
100 metres at the Asian Athletics Championships